Melanophryniscus is a genus of toads in the family Bufonidae. They are found in northern half of Argentina, southern Bolivia, southern Brazil, Paraguay, and Uruguay. Common name South American redbelly toads has been coined for them.

Species 
There are 31 recognized species:

The AmphibiaWeb also recognizes Melanophryniscus orejasmirandai, which the Amphibian Species of the World treats as synonym of Melanophryniscus pachyrhynus.

References

External links
  Taxon Melanophryniscus at https://web.archive.org/web/20160606043808/http://www.itis.gov/index.html. (Accessed: May 3, 2008).
  Taxon Melanophryniscus at https://web.archive.org/web/20080501142231/http://data.gbif.org/welcome.htm 

 
Amphibians of South America
Amphibian genera